Oberea consentanea is a species of beetle in the family Cerambycidae. It was described by Francis Polkinghorne Pascoe in 1867. It is known from Borneo.

Varietas
 Oberea consentanea var. posticalis Breuning, 1962
 Oberea consentanea var. mausoni Breuning, 1950
 Oberea consentanea var. unicolor Breuning, 1956

References

consentanea
Beetles described in 1867